Quecha may refer to two different groups of Native American peoples and languages:

 Quechan, people who live on the Fort Yuma Indian Reservation in Arizona and California
 Quechan language, language of the Quechan people
 Quechua people of South America, including Peru, Ecuador, Bolivia, Chile, Colombia and Argentina
 Quechuan languages, family of languages spoken by the Quechua peoples

See also
 Quechua (disambiguation)

Language and nationality disambiguation pages